The 1947–48 United States network television schedule was nominally from September 1947 to March 1948, but scheduling ideas were still being worked out and did not follow modern standards. The schedule is followed by a list per network of returning series, new series, and series cancelled after the 1946–47 season.

Only NBC and DuMont had networks until CBS joined in May 1948, and coaxial cable connections were only available for a few cities on the East Coast. Most other parts of the United States created local shows or broadcast film programs.

Although fewer than twenty television stations were in operation at the end of 1947, more than 30 began broadcasting in 1948.

New series and those making their network debuts are highlighted in bold, while series that ended during the season are highlighted in italics. However, as network programming was still in its infancy and in a state of flux, all the new fall series below for this season began in November and December. A midseason replacement, DuMont's The Original Amateur Hour, first aired Sunday, January 18, 1948, was the most popular series of the 1947–48 television season.

Although television was still in its infancy, several notable series debuted during this season, particularly Mary Kay and Johnny (first sitcom to be broadcast on network television in the US, and likely the world's second television sitcom after British series Pinwright's Progress), Texaco Star Theatre (the variety show that made Milton Berle TV's first star) and The Ed Sullivan Show (which would run until 1971, with performances by Elvis Presley and The Beatles being among the highest-viewed moments in American television history).

Few recordings of live television from this season were preserved. Among the surviving kinescopes are six episodes of Kraft Television Theatre from 1948 (March 3, March 17, March 24, March 31, April 21, and May 5) held by the Library of Congress, an episode of Eye Witness from February 26, 1948, two episodes of The Swift Show from 1948 (May 13 and May 27) held by the UCLA Film and Television Archive, and an episode of NBC Symphony Orchestra with Arturo Toscanini from March 20, 1948, held by the Paley Center for Media.

One series that debuted during this season, Meet the Press, continues to air on NBC celebrating its seventy years as of 2017.

Legend

Schedule

Sunday 

Notes: The Original Amateur Hour ran Sundays on DuMont beginning on January 18, 1948.

CBS began broadcasting as a network in May 1948 and premiered Toast of the Town, better known as The Ed Sullivan Show, on June 20, 1948.

Monday 

* The Walter Compton News aired on DuMont Monday through Friday from 6:45 to 7pm ET beginning on June 16 on WTTG and on August 25 on the DuMont network. In January 1948, Camera Headlines replaced The Walter Compton News and Look Upon a Star, airing Monday through Friday at 7:30pm ET, with I.N.S. Telenews following at 7:45pm ET on Tuesdays only.
** During the winter of 1948, The Esso Newsreel was replaced by the NBC Television Newsreel, which ran from Monday to Friday at 7:50, soon becoming the Camel Newsreel Theatre. America Song aired Mondays from 7:30 to 7:50 beginning in April.
*** During the late spring of 1948, CBS premiered the CBS Television News, running weekdays at 7:30, followed by Face the Music from 7:45 to 8:00.
**** Village Barn aired from 9:10 to 10:00 on NBC beginning in May.

Tuesday

Wednesday 

* Winner Take All premiered on CBS in July.

Thursday 

Notes: On CBS, To the Queen's Taste began airing during the late spring or early summer of 1948.

On DuMont, King Cole's Birthday Party also was known simply as Birthday Party. It debuted on May 15, 1947, on DuMont's New York City station, WABD and by early 1948 was carried by the entire network. The date on which it switched from a New York-only broadcast to a network-wide one is unclear.

Friday 

* Sportsman's Quiz and What's It Worth premiered on CBS during the late spring.

Saturday

By network

ABC

New Series
Hollywood Screen Test 
Kiernan's Corner 
Movieland Quiz 
News and Views 
Sports with Joe Hasel 
Teenage Book Club 
That Reminds Me 
Quizzing the News

CBS

New Series
CBS Television News 
Face the Music 
The Fred Waring Show 
Sportsman's Quiz 
To the Queen's Taste 
Toast of the Town 
We the People 
What's It Worth 
Winner Take All

DuMont

Returning series
The Adventures of Oky Doky
Boxing from Jamaica Arena
Camera Headlines
Doorway to Fame
Highway to the Stars
The Jack Eigen Show
Key to the Missing
King Cole's Birthday Party
The Original Amateur Hour
Small Fry Club
 Western movie

New series
Camera Headlines *
Charade Quiz
Court of Current Issues *
I.N.S. Telenews *
Look Upon a Star *
Mary Kay and Johnny
The Original Amateur Hour *
Playroom *
The Walter Compton News *

NBC

Returning Series
America Song
Americana
Author Meets the Critics
The Bigelow Show
Boxing from Madison Square Garden
Camel Newsreel Theatre
Campus Hoopla
Duffy's Tavern
Gillette Cavalcade of Sports
Hour Glass
Juvenile Jury
Kraft Television Theatre
Mary Kay and Johnny
Meet the Press
Musical Miniatures
The Nature of Things
Story of the Week
The Swift Show
The Texaco Star Theater
You Are an Artist

New Series
Admiral Presents Five Star Revue — Welcome Aboard
The Black Robe
The Chevrolet Tele-Theatre
Girl Anour Town
Greatest Fight of the Century
The Gulf Road Show Starring Bob Smith
Mary Margaret McBride
NBC Presents
NBC Television Newsreel *
The Philco Television Playhouse
Picture This
Princess Sagaphi
Stop Me If You've Heard This One *
The Swift Show *
The Ted Steele Show
Television Playhouse *
Village Barn *
Wrestling From St. Nicholas Arena
Your Show Time

Not returning from 1946–47:
The Borden Show
Bristol-Myers Tele-Varieties
Broadway Previews
Face to Face
Famous Fights
Geographically Speaking
Hour Glass
I Love to Eat
In Town Today
Let's Rhumba
NBC Television Theatre

Note: The * indicates that the program was introduced in midseason.

References

 Bergmann, Ted; Skutch, Ira (2002). The DuMont Television Network: What Happened?. Lanham, Maryland: Scarecrow Press. .
 Castleman, H. & Podrazik, W. (1982). Watching TV: Four Decades of American Television. New York: McGraw-Hill. 314 pp.

United States primetime network television schedules
1947 in American television
1948 in American television